Olifants WMA, or Olifants Water Management Area (coded: 4), Includes the following major rivers: the Elands River, Wilge River,
Steelpoort River and Olifants River, and covers the following dams:

 Blyderivierpoort Dam - Blyde River 
 Bronkhorstspruit Dam - Bronkhorstspruit River 
 Buffelskloof Dam - Waterval River 
 Flag Boshielo Dam - Olifants River 
 Klaserie Dam - Klaserie River 
 Loskop Dam - Olifants River 
 Middelburg Dam - Little Olifants River 
 Ohrigstad Dam - Ohrigstad River 
 Rhenosterkop Dam - Elands River 
 Rust de Winter Dam - Elands River 
 Tonteldoos Dam - Tonteldoos River 
 Tours Dam - Ngwabitsi River 
 Vlugkraal Dam - Vlugkraal River 
 Witbank Dam - Olifants River

Bouderies 
Tertiary drainage regions B11, B12, B20, B31, B32, B41, B42, B51, B52, B60 and B71 to B73.

References 
Hydrology

Water Management Areas